Next Retail India Ltd is a subsidiary of the Videocon Industries Ltd and engages in retailing consumer electronics in India. It was founded in 2003 and currently has 600 showrooms across 25 states of India. It plans to open 400 new showrooms to increase its size to 1,000 odd retail stores by the end of the fiscal year 2010–11.

NEXT is a multi-brand, multi-product retail chain which stocks an entire range of consumer durables, right from Air-conditioners, FPDs (Flat Panel Displays), CTVs, Washing Machines, Refrigerators, Microwaves, Home Theatre Systems to STBs (Set Top Boxes), Mobile Phones, Gaming Consoles, small home appliances and much more! NEXT retails world's most popular brands such as Panasonic, Toshiba, Mitsubishi, LG, Samsung, Videocon, Sony, Electrolux, Kelvinator, Whirlpool, Onida, Philips, Kenstar, Sansui and its own brand.

References

External links 
 Official Website

2003 establishments in Maharashtra
Companies based in Mumbai
Retail companies of India
Retail companies established in 2003